Ana Cristina Menezes Oliveira de Souza (born 7 May 2004) is a Brazilian professional volleyball player, who is participating in the 2020 Summer Olympics with the Brazil national team.
She participated at the 2019 FIVB Volleyball Girls' U18 World Championship, winning a bronze medal and the 2019 FIVB Volleyball Women's U20 World Championship,

On the club level, she played for Sesc Flamengo, and plays for Fenerbahce Opet.

Awards

Individuals

 2021 South American Championship – "Best Opposite Spiker"

References

External links 
 Ana Cristina de Souza vs SESI - (16 years old) - Superliga

2004 births
Living people
Brazilian women's volleyball players
Volleyball players at the 2020 Summer Olympics
Olympic volleyball players of Brazil
Medalists at the 2020 Summer Olympics
Olympic medalists in volleyball
Olympic silver medalists for Brazil
Volleyball players from Rio de Janeiro (city)